New Church is a census-designated place (CDP) in Accomack County, Virginia, United States. Per the 2020 census, the population was 256.

Pitts Neck Farm was added to the National Register of Historic Places in 1976.

Geography
It lies at an elevation of 23 feet.

Demographics

2020 census

Note: the US Census treats Hispanic/Latino as an ethnic category. This table excludes Latinos from the racial categories and assigns them to a separate category. Hispanics/Latinos can be of any race.

References

Census-designated places in Accomack County, Virginia
Census-designated places in Virginia